The 1939 Missouri Tigers football team was an American football team that represented the University of Missouri in the Big Six Conference (Big 6) during the 1939 college football season. The team compiled an 8–2 record (5–0 against Big 6 opponents), won the Big 6 championship, lost to Georgia Tech in the 1940 Orange Bowl, outscored all opponents by a combined total of 155 to 79, and was ranked No. 6 in the final AP Poll. Don Faurot was the head coach for the fifth of 19 seasons. The team played its home games at Memorial Stadium in Columbia, Missouri.

The team's leading scorer was Paul Christman with 42 points. Christman was also selected as a first-team All-American by the All-America Board, Collier's Weekly (chosen by Grantland Rice), Newspaper Enterprise Association, and The Sporting News. He finished third in the 1939 Heisman Trophy voting, was inducted into the College Football Hall of Fame in 1956, and had his jersey (No. 44) retired at Missouri.

Schedule

References

Missouri
Missouri Tigers football seasons
Big Eight Conference football champion seasons
Missouri Tigers football